San Isidoro may refer to:
Basilica of San Isidoro, Leon, Spain
Sant’Isidoro a Capo le Case, Rome, Italy